Methfessel is a German surname. Notable people with the surname include:

 Albert Methfessel (1785–1869), German composer, singer, musicologist, and conductor 
 Friedrich Methfessel (1771–1807), German composer

German-language surnames